Fort Kochi beach is a beach along the Arabian Sea situated in Fort Kochi in the city of Kochi in South India, Kerala state.

Points of interests 
Each installation is operated by a team of up to six fishermen.

Other points of interests include the jetty towards the Vembanad Lake respectively to the Kerala backwaters. Colonial-style bungalows can be seen along the shoreline, as well as the Vasco da Gama square, the remains of Fort Emmanuel along the granite walkway and many stalls, which make traditional cuisines using freshly caught fish. A section of the beach is not accessible to visitors as it is under the control of the Indian Navy.

Nature 
As reported by the Deccan Chronicle, the Kochi Corporation started as a temporary measure, a massive cleaning campaign covering heritage structures supported by around 500 volunteers on occasion of the World Environment Day in June 2015, as littering became a serious problem.

References

External links 

 Fort Kochi beach on cochin.org

Culture of Kochi
Geography of Kochi
Beaches of Kerala
Tourist attractions in Kochi